Kętrzyno is a non-operational PKP railway station in Kętrzyno (Pomeranian Voivodeship), Poland.

References 
Kętrzyno article at Polish stations database, URL accessed at 18 March 2006

Railway stations in Pomeranian Voivodeship
Disused railway stations in Pomeranian Voivodeship
Wejherowo County